Viscount Southwell, of Castle Mattress in the County of Limerick, is a title in the Peerage of Ireland. It was created in 1776 for Thomas Southwell, 3rd Baron Southwell. The Southwell family descends from Thomas Southwell. In 1662 he was created a Baronet, of Castle Mattress in the County of Limerick, in the Baronetage of Ireland. He was succeeded by his son, the second Baronet. He represented Limerick County in the Irish Parliament. In 1717 he was created Baron Southwell, of Castle Mattress, in the County of Limerick, in the Peerage of Ireland. His grandson was the aforementioned third Baron, who was elevated to a viscountcy in 1776. Before succeeding in the barony he had represented Enniscorthy in the Irish House of Commons. His great-grandson, the fourth Viscount, served as Lord Lieutenant of County Leitrim between 1872 and 1878.  the titles are held by his great-great-grandson, the eighth Viscount, who succeeded his father in that year.

Southwell Baronets, of Castle Mattress (1662)
Sir Thomas Southwell, 1st Baronet (died 1680)
Sir Thomas Southwell, 2nd Baronet (1665–1720) (created Baron Southwell in 1717)

Barons Southwell (1717)
Thomas Southwell, 1st Baron Southwell (1665–1720)
Thomas Southwell, 2nd Baron Southwell (1698–1766)
Thomas George Southwell, 3rd Baron Southwell (1721–1780) (created Viscount Southwell in 1776)

Viscounts Southwell (1776)

Thomas George Southwell, 1st Viscount Southwell (1721–1780)
Thomas Arthur Southwell, 2nd Viscount Southwell (1742–1796)
Thomas Anthony Southwell, 3rd Viscount Southwell (1777–1860)
Thomas Arthur Joseph Southwell, 4th Viscount Southwell (1836–1878)
Arthur Robert Pyers Southwell, 5th Viscount Southwell (1872–1944)
Robert Arthur William Joseph Southwell, 6th Viscount Southwell (1898–1960)
Pyers Anthony Joseph Southwell, 7th Viscount Southwell (1930–2019)
Richard Andrew Pyers Southwell, 8th Viscount Southwell (born 1956)

The heir presumptive and last in line to the titles is the present holder's younger brother, the Hon. Charles Anthony John Southwell (born 1962).

Ancestry
(ancestors of 7th Viscount)

Notes

References 
Kidd, Charles, Williamson, David (editors). Debrett's Peerage and Baronetage (1990 edition). New York: St Martin's Press, 1990,

External links
Pyers Southwell, 7th Viscount Southwell

Viscountcies in the Peerage of Ireland
Noble titles created in 1776